The Fortune 500 is an annual list compiled and published by Fortune magazine that ranks 500 of the largest United States corporations by total revenue for their respective fiscal years. The list includes publicly held companies, along with privately held companies for which revenues are publicly available. The concept of the Fortune 500 was created by Edgar P. Smith, a Fortune editor, and the first list was published in 1955. The Fortune 500 is more commonly used than its subset Fortune 100 or superset Fortune 1000.

History 
The Fortune 500, created by Edgar P. Smith, was first published in 1955. The original top ten companies were General Motors, Jersey Standard, U.S. Steel, General Electric, Esmark, Chrysler, Armour, Gulf Oil, Mobil, and DuPont.

Methodology
The original Fortune 500 was limited to companies whose revenues were derived from manufacturing, mining, and energy exploration. At the same time, Fortune published companion "Fortune 50" lists of the 50 largest commercial banks (ranked by assets), utilities (ranked by assets), life insurance companies (ranked by assets), retailers (ranked by gross revenues) and transportation companies (ranked by revenues). Fortune magazine changed its methodology in 1994 to include service companies. With the change came 291 new entrants to the famous list including three in the Top 10. There is a lag in creating the list, so for example, the 2019 Fortune 500 is based on each company's financial years ending in late 2018 (most commonly, on December 31), or early 2019.

Influence
As of 2020, the Fortune 500 companies represent approximately two-thirds of the United States' Gross Domestic Product with approximately $14.2 trillion in revenue, $1.2 trillion in profits, and $20.4 trillion in total market value. These revenue figures also account for approximately 18% of the gross world product. The companies collectively employ a total of 29.2 million people worldwide, or nearly 0.4% of the world's total population.

Overview

The following is the list of top 10 companies.

Breakdown by state

This is the list of the top 10 states with the most companies within the Fortune 500.

See also

 40 under 40 (Fortune Magazine)
 Fortune Global 500
 Fortune India 500
 Fortune 1000
 List of largest companies in the United States by revenue
 List of largest companies by revenue
 List of Fortune 500 computer software and information companies
 List of women CEOs of Fortune 500 companies
 Forbes Global 2000
 Total Fortune 1000 companies by urban area list

References

External links
 Official website
 Full list of Fortune 500 companies: 1955–2005, 2006, 2007, 2008,  2009, 2010, 2011, 2012, 2013, 2014, 2015, 2016, 2017, 2018, 2019, 2020, 2021, 2022

Lists of companies by revenue
Fortune (magazine)
Top lists
Annual magazine issues